Indira Gandhi ministry may refer to:

First Indira Gandhi ministry, the Indian government headed by Indira Gandhi from 1966 to 1971
Second Indira Gandhi ministry, the Indian government headed by Indira Gandhi from 1971 to 1977
Third Indira Gandhi ministry, the Indian government headed by Indira Gandhi from 1980 to 1984

See also 
Indira Gandhi